Twister is a game of physical skill produced by Milton Bradley Company and Winning Moves Games USA. It is played on a large plastic mat that is spread on the floor or ground. The mat has four rows of six large colored circles on it with a different color in each row: red, yellow, green and blue. A spinner tells players where they have to place their hand or foot. The game promotes itself as "the game that ties you up in knots".

Gameplay

A spinner is attached to a square board and is used to determine where the player has to put their hand or foot. The spinner is divided into four labeled sections: left foot, right foot, left hand, and right hand. Each of those four sections are divided into the four colors (red, yellow, green, and blue). After spinning, the combination is called (for example: "right hand yellow") and players must move their matching hand or foot to a circle of the correct color.

In a two-player game, no two people can have a hand or foot on the same circle; the rules are different for more players. Owing to the scarcity of colored circles, players will often be required to put themselves in unlikely or precarious positions, eventually causing someone to fall. A person is eliminated when they fall or when their elbow or knee touches the mat.

History and analysis

In 1964, Reyn Guyer Sr. owned and managed a design company which made in-store displays for Fortune 500 companies.

Charles Foley was a respected and successful toy designer for Lakeside Industries in Minneapolis and answered an ad for an experienced toy designer by Reynolds Guyer Sr. of Guyer Company. Foley interviewed with Reyn Guyer Sr. and his son, Reyn, who were interested in product development within the toy business. After interviewing Foley, Guyer and his son discussed the possibility of starting a small division of the company in product development. His father agreed, for a short term, to support his son's idea for product development, and hired Foley, who negotiated a royalty agreement with Guyer Company for all games and toy items designed by Foley. Guyer Company agreed, and officially hired Foley. Foley hired Neil Rabens, an accomplished product design artist with an art degree from the Minneapolis School of Art and Design.

The game ideas ranged from small kids' games to word games for adults. Foley had an idea for utilizing people as game pieces as part of the game idea, "a party game". Rabens had the idea to utilize a colored mat, allowing people to interact with each other, in a game idea he had developed while a student in design school. Foley saw the idea and developed the concept for having the colored dots line up in rows, and, with a spinner, created the idea for calling out players' hands and feet to the colored dots called out from the spinner. This would create a tangled-up situation between two people, and the one that falls first would lose.

With the support of Reyn Guyer Sr., Charles Foley and Neil Rabens submitted, on 1966-04-14, and was granted 1969-07-08, US Pat# 3,454,279, for what was originally called "Pretzel". Foley, with his extensive experience in the toy industry, called on his good friend, Mel Taft, Sr. V.P. for Milton Bradley in 1966, for a product idea presentation. Milton Bradley embraced the idea for the "Pretzel" game but renamed the game "Twister".

Twister became a success when actress Eva Gabor played it with Johnny Carson on television's The Tonight Show on May 3, 1966. However, in its success, it was also controversial. The company that produced it, Milton Bradley, was accused by its competitors of selling "sex in a box". That accusation is speculated to be because it was the first popular American game to use human bodies as playing pieces.

In 1966, Twister was licensed to Nintendo for the Japanese market, where it was released as Twister Game.

In 1984, Hasbro acquired the Milton Bradley Company, becoming Twister's parent company. The Reyn Guyer Creative Group continues to work closely with Hasbro to develop and market new additions to the line of Twister products.

Co-inventor Charles Foley died on July 1, 2013, at the age of 82.

Phenomenon

Twister, much like the hula hoop, was one of the many toy fad phenomena that came about in the second half of the 20th century. Microsoft Encarta labels Twister as being an "industry phenomenon" that "captures the public's imagination, and sells in the millions". Being one of the earliest toy fads and a "national craze for a short time", Twister was a game that was able to bring all age groups together, whether children or adults. Twister, being both globally spread and highly popular, is unlike other games of its stature in the sense that it is accepted by all social classes. In an article by Richard A. Peterson (sociologist) and Albert Simkus, they state, "While the evidence of the first half of this century suggests strong links between social status and cultural taste, there is growing evidence that there is no longer a one-to-one correspondence between taste and status group membership in advanced postindustrial societies like the United States".

Accessibility 
There are publicly available instructions on how to alter a Twister game to make it accessible to color-blind individuals and to completely blind individuals.

Blindfolded Twister is an accessible variant where there are four different tactile symbols on the mat, and the players are blindfolded and have to find a circle with the named symbol by feeling.

Reception
Games magazine included Twister in their "Top 100 Games of 1980", praising it as being "nearly as well known as Spin the Bottle, and ten times more enjoyable" while noting that it is "Best played on a soft surface with people you'd like to know better."

Games magazine included Twister in their "Top 100 Games of 1981", noting that "To become a grandmaster at Twister, the first requirement is agility" and that "Like any good party game, Twister can be fun or it can be humiliating."

Games magazine included Twister in their "Top 100 Games of 1982", noting that players can "Become a human pretzel in this popular party game for people who don't mind getting better acquainted" but cautioned to "watch the person with the spinner—the temptation to cheat and call the most difficult move is usually irresistible".

References
Notes

External links 

 Official Hasbro website for Twister
 Torsten Sillke's Twister Homepage
 
 Patent for Twister
 Website performs spinner function

Games of physical skill
Party board games
1960s toys
Products introduced in 1966
Milton Bradley Company games